Smith School may refer to:

Abiel Smith School, a school for African American children in Boston in the 1800s
Smith School of Enterprise and the Environment
Robert H. Smith School of Business at the University of Maryland
Stephen J.R. Smith School of Business at Queens University in Ontario, Canada